Wood's slit-faced bat (Nycteris woodi) is a species of slit-faced bat that lives in the dry savanna regions of Southern Africa. Its numbers are declining due to habitat loss from logging and farming, pesticide use, and the decline of baobab trees on which these bats depend for roost sites.

References

Mammals of South Africa
Bats of Africa
Nycteridae
Mammals described in 1914
Taxa named by Knud Andersen